The V-Girls was a feminist performance art group that was active from 1986 to 1996.

Background
The V-Girls were composed of Martha Baer, Jessica Chalmers, Erin Cramer, Marianne Weems and Andrea Fraser. The group was initially formed as a study group in order to meet-up and read feminist psychoanalytic theory, but soon morphed into discussions of their own art and scholarship.

The V-Girls were influenced by feminist inquiry in relation to institutions, such as universities. Feminist discussions regarding power relations, the status of women, and canon development lead to the need for ways of challenging normalised phallocentric ideas.

Performance style
The five women would sit at a long table in order to form a discussion panel. Four of them would be dressed in suits with thickly framed glasses, symbols of traditional power and intellect. The fifth would act as the discussion's mediator and usually be dressed more casually, indicating a symbolic separation of social status. The panel would provide a comedic critique of various professional discourses within the spaces in which they originated, such as conferences, universities, art galleries and museums.

Key works
The V-Girls first performance was titled Sex and Your Holiday Season and was performed in 1987 at Four Walls gallery in New Jersey.

Academic in the Alps: In Search of the Swiss Miss(s) took place in 1988 at the University of Massachusetts.

The Question of Manet's Olympia: Posed and Skirted was first performed in 1989.

References

External links 
 Website

American contemporary artists
Feminist artists
Feminist theory
Political art
Institutional Critique artists
American performance artists
20th-century American women artists